Yinghai station is a station on Line 8 of the Beijing Subway. It was opened on December 30, 2018.

Station Layout 
The station has an elevated island platform.

Exits 
There are 4 exits, lettered A, B1, B2, and C. Exits A and B1 are accessible.

References 

Beijing Subway stations in Daxing District